Vera Pearl Little-Augustithis (December 10, 1928October 24, 2012) was an American contralto and mezzo-soprano opera singer who belonged to the ensemble of the Deutsche Oper Berlin for more than four decades. She performed each of the important mezzo-soprano roles of the repertoire, appearing at major international opera houses and festivals. She took part in world premieres of operas by Hans Werner Henze, in 1965 Der junge Lord in Berlin and in 1966 Die Bassariden at the Salzburg Festival.

Life 
Little was born in Memphis, Tennessee. She won a Munich opera competition in 1950. After graduating from Talladega College in Alabama in 1952, she came to Paris to study with a Fulbright Scholarship with Georges Jouatte. She studied further in Rome, Copenhagen, and in Germany with Margarete Bärwinkel and Richard Sengeleiter.

In 1958, Carl Ebert brought her to Berlin to what was then called the "Städtische Oper Berlin", later Deutsche Oper Berlin, where she remained based for more than four decades. There she had a major success in 1963 in the title role of Bizet's Carmen. She took part in the 1965 world premiere of Hans Werner Henze's Der junge Lord, as Begonia.

She was the first African American singer to perform at the invitation of Vittorio Gui in the Vatican before Pope John XXIII, singing a Bach cantata in 1959, which made her internationally known. She appeared at the Salzburg Festival in 1966 in the world premiere of Henze's Die Bassariden. She recorded the role of Giovanna in Donizetti's Anna Bolena conducted by Alberto Erede in 1967, broadcast by Westdeutscher Rundfunk. In 1970, she was awarded the title Kammersängerin. After many negotiations and complications, she appeared in 1973 for the first time in her hometown of Memphis as Ulrica in Verdi's Un ballo in maschera.

Besides music, she was interested in literature. She wrote poems, some of which were set to music by Boris Blacher. Some were translated by Hans Wollschläger. In 1999, she published a memoir of her career.

Little died in Berlin at the age of 84.

Publications

References

External links 
 
 

1928 births
2012 deaths
Singers from Memphis, Tennessee
Writers from Memphis, Tennessee
Talladega College alumni
American operatic contraltos
American operatic mezzo-sopranos
American women poets
American women memoirists
20th-century American memoirists
20th-century African-American women singers
20th-century American women opera singers
African-American women opera singers
20th-century American poets
20th-century American women writers
African-American women writers
African-American poets
African-American memoirists
Classical musicians from Tennessee
American expatriates in Germany
21st-century American women